Mimi Hwang is an American cellist and a winner of both the Banff and the Evian International String Quartet Competitions.

Early life 
Hwang was born in Los Angeles, California. Hwang's parents are immigrants of Chinese ancestry. At age 8, Hwang began playing the cello.

Education 
Hwang earned a bachelor's degree with distinction from New England Conservatory of Music. Hwang earned a master's degree from San Francisco Conservatory of Music.

Career 
Hwang is the founding member of Franciscan String Quartet with musicians Wendy Sharp, Alison Harney, and Marcia Cassidy. In 1987, the Franciscan String Quartet performed their first formal New York concert at Weill Hall of Carnegie Hall.

Hwang have performed with such quartets as Ciompi Quartet, Tokyo Quartet, Ying and Colorado Quartet and was a participant of both Beijing Philharmonic and Los Angeles Philharmonics. She also played at the San Francisco Chamber Orchestra and with such musicians as Raphael Hillyer, Laurence Lesser and  Michael Tree. Later on, she became a founder of Cello Divas and Quartos with which she appeared in such places as Banff, Norfolk, Roycroft, and Skaneateles as well as Aspen Music Festival. Currently she is co-artistic director of the Yellow Barn Music School and Festival and is both Trustee of the Arts and Cultural Council for Greater Rochester member. Hwang plays in Amenda Quartet.

Personal life 
Hwang has two daughters, Emma and Celia. Hwang resides in Brighton, New York.

References

External links 
 Margery Hwang at Eastman School of Music
 Margery Hwang at Nazareth College
 January 31, 2016 Performance at Yale
 Hwang's performances at Yale

Living people
American classical cellists
Year of birth missing (living people)
American women classical cellists
21st-century American women